DCD Rights, formerly NBD Television Limited is a UK-based international independent distributor of TV programming and formats founded in 1983 by CEO Nicky Davies Williams. The company became part of UK independent production and distribution Group DCD Media in 2005.

Programming 

The DCD Rights programming catalogue covers a broad range of  genres from drama, factual, rock/pop music, to entertainment, and documentary programming. The catalogue also includes entertainment film and arts documentaries as well as classic feature films. It sells to television channels, internet content providers, DVD retailers and distributors and non-theatrical releases worldwide.

External links
DCD Media
DCD Rights

Television production companies of the United Kingdom